Huai Krachao is a district (amphoe) in the eastern part of Kanchanaburi province, central Thailand.

History
Tambons Huai Krachao, Wang Phai, Sa Long Ruea, and Don Salaep were separated from Phanom Thuan district and formed the minor district (king amphoe) Huai Krachao on 30 April 1994. It was upgraded to district status on 11 October 1997.

Geography
Neighboring districts are (from the south clockwise) Phanom Thuan, Bo Phloi, Lao Khwan of Kanchanaburi Province and U Thong of Suphanburi province.

Administration
The district is divided into four sub-districts (tambons), which are further subdivided into 67 villages (mubans). There are no municipal (thesaban) areas. There are four tambon administrative organizations (TAO).

References

External links

amphoe.com

Huai Krachao